"This Time" is a song written by Chips Moman, which was first recorded by Thomas Wayne and was released as a single on the Fernwood Records label in March 1958. On March 31, 1958, the song was released on the Mercury Records label, as the B-side of "You're The One That Done It".

Background
This song is about rejection, and breaking up of a love relationship with a girl, who is leaving and going away for unknown reasons, except for saying too much. The singer states that there will be no more love and affection, including a goodnight kiss, because he is losing the girl.

Troy Shondell version

In 1961, Troy Shondell released a version of the song, which became an international hit. Shondell's version was released on the Goldcrest Records label, and was later leased to Liberty Records for distribution. Shondell's version spent 13 weeks on the Billboard Hot 100 chart, peaking at No. 6, while reaching No. 4 on Norway's VG-lista, No. 4 on Canada's CHUM Hit Parade, No. 8 on New Zealand's "Lever Hit Parade", No. 18 on the United Kingdom's New Musical Express chart, and No. 22 on the United Kingdom's Record Retailer chart.

The song begins and ends with Spanish guitar strums. Those strums were borrowed  for the ending of the instrumental surfing song "Mr. Rebel", by Eddie and the Showmen (1962).

Chart performance

Other recordings
In 1981, Shakin' Stevens included a cover on his Shaky LP.

References

1958 songs
1958 singles
1961 singles
Songs written by Chips Moman
Shakin' Stevens songs